Cloquet can refer to:

People
 Ghislain Cloquet, Belgian-born French cinematographer
 Hippolyte Cloquet, French physician and anatomist
 Jules Germain Cloquet, French physician and surgeon

Other
 Cloquet, Minnesota, an inhabited place
 Cloquet River, Minnesota, United States
 1918 Cloquet Fire, a massive fire in northern Minnesota in October, 1918
 Cloquet Terminal Railroad, a small terminal railroad
 Cloquet Valley State Forest, Minnesota
 Cloquet's canal, see Hyaloid artery
 Cloquet's node, a lymph node